Chrysocercops malayana is a moth of the family Gracillariidae. It is known from Malaysia (Negeri Sembilan, Pahang and Selangor).

The wingspan is 5–7 mm.

The larvae feed on Shorea species, including Shorea acuminata, Shorea bracteolata and Shorea leprosula. They mine the leaves of their host plant. The mine is very similar to those of Chrysocercops thapai, but they are mostly located on the upper surface, and not on the lower surface.

References

Chrysocercops
Moths described in 1992